The  Indo-Portuguese Creole of Bombay was a creole language based on Portuguese, which grew out of the long contact between the Portuguese and local languages such as Marathi and Gujarati. Currently this language is extinct. It was spoken in Bombay (now Mumbai) and northern India: Bassein, Salsette, Thana, Chevai, Mahim, Tecelaria, Dadar, Parel, Cavel, Bandora-Badra, Govai, Marol, Andheri, Versova, Malvan, Manori, Mazagaon. This language was, after the Ceylon creole dialect of Indo-Portuguese, the most important. In 1906 there were still close to 5,000 people who spoke Portuguese Creole as their mother tongue, 2,000 in Mumbai and Mahim, 1000 in Bandora, 500 in Thana, 100 in Curla (now Kurla), 50 in Bassein and 1,000 in other towns. There were, at that time, schools that taught Creole and the richest classes, which were replaced by the English language.

See also 
 Portuguese-based creole languages
 Indo-Portuguese creoles

References

Portuguese-based pidgins and creoles
Languages of India
Extinct languages of Asia
Culture of Mumbai
Portuguese language in Asia